Marcin Kikut (born 25 June 1983 in Barlinek) is a retired Polish footballer who played as a defender or a midfielder.

Career
His former club was Amica Wronki. In August 2012, he joined Ruch Chorzów. Kikut was also a member of U-21 Poland national football team. He made his debut in senior national team on 10 December 2010.

References

External links
 

1983 births
Living people
People from Barlinek
Polish footballers
Ekstraklasa players
Amica Wronki players
Lech Poznań players
Ruch Chorzów players
Widzew Łódź players
Bytovia Bytów players
Association football defenders
Association football utility players
Sportspeople from West Pomeranian Voivodeship
Poland under-21 international footballers
Poland international footballers